Roger Wilson may refer to:

Roger Wilson (ice hockey) (born 1946), Canadian/American professional ice hockey player
Roger B. Wilson (born 1948), American Democratic politician, former Governor of Missouri
Roger Wilson (actor) (born 1956), American film and TV actor
Roger Wilson (folk musician), British folk musician
 Roger "Hurricane" Wilson (born 1953), American electric blues guitarist, singer and songwriter
Roger Wilson (rugby union) (born 1981), Irish rugby player
Roger Wilson (bishop) (1905–2002), Bishop of Wakefield and of Chichester
Roger Wilson (Indian Army officer) (1882–1966), Indian Army general
Roger C. Wilson (1912–1988), composer of church music
the birth name of Sophie Wilson (born 1957), British computer scientist
Roger H. Wilson (born 1937), American politician in the state of Florida